Angel Alfredo Vera (born 18 August 1972 in Argentina) is an Argentinean professional football coach and former player. He holds an Argentine Football Association 'A' Level Coaching License.  However, his license was questioned by the Football Association of Indonesia as rules prescribe that a coach of a highest-division club must have a license equal to an AFC 'A' License. In response, he exemplified that the Malaysian Football Association did not question fellow Argentinean Mario Gómez who was in charge of Johor Darul Ta'zim F.C. in 2016. In the end, he was dismissed from the five-time champions of the Indonesian top division due to this.

Afterwards, the manager was declared head coach of Persebaya Surabaya in mid season (after Iwan Setiawan was fired) with the aim to get them promoted to the Liga 1 just like he did with Persipura Jayapura. His achievements with Persipura and his mid-season appointment as coach of Persebaya made him be known as'a mid-season coaching specialist'.

Playing career
As a player, he plied his trade as a defender in his homeland of Argentina, Venezuela, Ecuador, and most recently Indonesia.

Managing career
Just in the 14th week of the 2016 Indonesia Soccer Championship A, Alfredo Vera replaced Jafri Sastra as head coach of Persipura Jayapura he would be the one responsible of reviving the team following their run of results under Jafri Sastra. Initially, he was considered 'not worthy' of coaching such a team. His first fixture as manager for the club was an encounter versus Bhayangkara F.C. in which he took Persipura to a 2-1 triumph. Following the win, he took them to two successive victories in a row facing Mitra Kukar and Persegres Gresik. By the end of the season, his team had suffered only two defeats in 21 outings compared to four losses in 14 games under Jafri Sastra. Also, he steered them to fifteen victories and four draws whereby they won the league. Because of this, his appointment was regarded as a success. His success is ascribable to his ability to communicate with players and his talent at seeing potential players; he used a 4-3-3 formation which relied on two young wingers, Osvaldo Haay and Ferinando Pahabol.

At the start of the 2017 season, the former defender decided not to buy a marquee player for Persipura Jayapura as he claimed they did not require one to boost the team's performance.

Honours

Player
C.D. Olmedo
Serie A: 2000

LDU Quito
Serie B: 2001

Manager
Persipura Jayapura
Indonesia Soccer Championship A: 2016

Persebaya Surabaya
Liga 2: 2017

References

Argentine football managers
Association football defenders
Argentine footballers
1972 births
Living people